Wayne Township is one of twelve townships in Jay County, Indiana, United States. As of the 2010 census, its population was 7,918 and it contained 3,748 housing units.

History
Wayne Township was organized in 1837.

Floral Hall was listed on the National Register of Historic Places in 1983.

Geography
The streams of Butternut Creek, Elm Brook, Golf Brook, Hearne Run, Little Salamonie River, Millers Branch, Race Run and Saw Run run through this township.

Cities and towns
 Portland (the county seat)

Unincorporated towns
 College Corner
 Liber

Adjacent townships
 Bearcreek Township (north)
 Noble Township (east)
 Madison Township (southeast)
 Pike Township (south)
 Jefferson Township (southwest)
 Greene Township (west)
 Jackson Township (northwest)

Cemeteries
The township contains five cemeteries: Green Park, Hearne, Jaque, Liber and Reed.

Major highways

Airports and landing strips
 Steed Field

References
 U.S. Board on Geographic Names (GNIS)
 United States Census Bureau cartographic boundary files

External links
 Indiana Township Association
 United Township Association of Indiana

Townships in Jay County, Indiana
Townships in Indiana